A royal college is a college that has received royal patronage and permission to use the prefix "royal".

Royal College may also refer to:

Places
 Royal College Street, Camden, London, England, UK; a major thoroughfare

Facilities and structures
Royal College Building (disambiguation)

Military and paramilitary
Royal Police College (disambiguation)
Royal Military College (disambiguation)
Royal Naval College (disambiguation)
Royal Air Force College (disambiguation)
 Royal College of Defence Studies, London, UK

Conservatoires
 Royal College of Music, London, UK
 Royal College of Music, Stockholm, Sweden
 Royal College of Organists, Birmingham, UK

Professional bodies
 Royal College of Anaesthetists, UK
 Royal College of Dental Surgeons of Ontario
 Royal College of Dentists of Canada
 Royal College of General Practitioners, UK
 Royal College of Midwives
 Royal College of Nursing, UK
 Royal College of Obstetricians and Gynaecologists, UK
 Royal College of Organists, UK
 Royal College of Paediatrics and Child Health, UK
 Royal College of Pathologists of Australasia
 Royal College of Pathologists, UK
 Royal College of Physicians, UK
 Royal College of Physicians of Edinburgh, UK
 Royal College of Physicians of Ireland
 Royal College of Physicians and Surgeons of Canada 
 Royal College of Physicians and Surgeons of Glasgow, UK
 Royal College of Psychiatrists, UK
 Royal College of Radiologists, UK
 Royal College of Science for Ireland
 Royal College of Surgeons of Edinburgh, UK
 Royal College of Surgeons of England, UK
 Royal College of Surgeons in Ireland 
 Royal College of Veterinary Surgeons, UK

Schools
 Panadura Royal College, Sri Lanka
 Royal Central College, Polonnaruwa, Sri Lanka
 Royal College, Colombo, Sri Lanka
 Royal College of Curepipe, Mauritius
 Royal College of St. Peter at Westminster, UK (Westminster School)
 Royal College Port-Louis, Mauritius

Universities and colleges
 Royal College, Addis Abeba, Addis Ababa, Ethiopia
 Royal College of Art, London, UK
 Royal College of Chemistry, London, UK (part of Imperial College London)
 Royal College of Engineering & Technology, Thrissur, Kerala, India
 Royal College of Mines, London, UK (now Royal School of Mines, part of Imperial College London)
 Royal College of Science, London, UK (part of Imperial College London)
 Royal College of Science, Arts and Commerce, Thane, Maharashtra, India
 Royal College of Science and Technology, Glasgow, UK (now the University of Strathclyde)

Other uses
Royal Australian College (disambiguation)
Royal Australian and New Zealand College (disambiguation)
Royal Canadian College (disambiguation)
Royal New Zealand College (disambiguation)

See also

Collège royal (disambiguation)